Archi (Sanskrit: अर्ची, Arcī, lit. "adored") is a queen, and an earthly avatar of Lakshmi in Hindu mythology. According to the Bhagavata Purana, Archi emerges from Vena's body, along with her husband, King Prithu, each of them incarnations of Lakshmi and Vishnu, respectively. 

As consort, she followed her husband into the forest for sannyasa. When he passed away, she dutifully self-immolates herself on his funeral pyre:

See also 
Prithu
Lakshmi

References 

 Hindu goddesses
 Lakshmi
 Consorts of Vishnu
 Mythological queens
 Characters in the Bhagavata Purana